River Cottage Australia is an Australian adaptation of the English franchise of the same name. The series sees former chef Paul West showcase local produce and farming while attempting to live in a self-sufficient manner. The series premiered on 27 June 2013 on The LifeStyle Channel and ran for two seasons before moving to The LifeStyle Channel's sister network LifeStyle Food in 2015 where it aired a further two seasons.

Development
On 30 November 2012, The LifeStyle Channel announced they had commissioned a local adaption of English franchise River Cottage. This marked the first time the series had been adapted internationally. The series saw English host Hugh Fearnley-Whittingstall travel to Australia to search for an Australian host and mentor them. The series was set to begin production in early 2013. On 25 March 2013 it was announced the host would be Tasmanian chef Paul West and the River Cottage would be located in Central Tilba, New South Wales. The first season, consisting of 8 episodes, premiered on 27 June 2013 and was a co-production between ITV Studios Australia and Keo Films.

On 16 August 2013, The LifeStyle Channel renewed the series for an additional two seasons. However, unlike season one which was a co-production between ITV Studios Australia and Keo Films, the new seasons would solely be produced by Keo Films.

The second season premiered on 1 May 2014.

In April 2015, it was announced the third season, consisting of 8 episodes, would premiere on 26 May 2015. However, unlike previous seasons, the series would premiere on The LifeStyle Channel's sister network LifeStyle Food.

On 5 November 2015, it was announced the series had been renewed for a fourth season, which premiered on 29 March 2016.

It was confirmed in January 2017 that the program had been cancelled. In June 2017, the 22 acre property featured in the show was sold with West and his family relocating to Newcastle.

Episodes

Series overview

Season 1 (2013)

Season 2 (2014)

Season 3 (2015)

Season 4 (2016)

Reception

In addition to Episode 2 being  the 47th most watched non-sport show of 2013, the first season was "the number one non-sports program across the STV platform while it was airing" and had "the second largest consolidated audience for The LifeStyle Channel in 2013".

Awards and nominations

Home Media

References

Lifestyle (Australian TV channel) original programming
2010s Australian reality television series
2013 Australian television series debuts
2016 Australian television series endings
English-language television shows
Australian television series based on British television series